D-Glyceric Acidemia (a.k.a. D-Glyceric Aciduria) is an inherited disease, in the category of inborn errors of metabolism.  It is caused by a mutation in the gene GLYCTK, which encodes for the enzyme glycerate kinase.

Pathophysiology
Glycerate kinase is an enzyme that catalyzes the conversion of D-glyceric acid (a.k.a. D-glycerate) to 2-phosphoglycerate.  This conversion is an intermediary reaction found in several metabolic pathways, including the degradation (break-down; catabolism) of serine, as well as the breakdown of fructose.

A deficiency in glycerate kinase activity leads to the accumulation of D-glyceric acid (a.k.a. D-glycerate) in bodily fluids and tissues.  D-glyceric acid can be measured in a laboratory that performs "analyte testing" for "organic acids" in blood (plasma) and urine.

Symptoms of the disease (in its most severe form) include progressive neurological impairment, mental/motor retardation, hypotonia, seizures, failure to thrive and metabolic acidosis.

Related conditions
D-Glyceric Acidemia should not be confused with L-Glyceric Acidemia (a.k.a. L-glyceric aciduria, a.k.a. primary hyperoxaluria type II ), which is associated with mutations in the GRHPR (encoding for the enzyme 'glyoxylate reductase/hydroxypyruvate reductase').

Diagnosis

References

External links 

 Genetics Home Reference (National Library of Medicine)  (information on D-glyceric acidemia and the GLYCTK gene)
 OMIM  (information on GLYCTK gene, encoding Glycerate Kinase)
 GeneTests  (information on genetic testing for D-Glyceric Acidemia)

Amino acid metabolism disorders